Jesse Pekka Joronen (born 21 March 1993) is a Finnish professional footballer who plays as a goalkeeper for  club Venezia. He made his senior debut for Finland in 2013.

Club career

Fulham
Born and raised in the small town of Simpele, Rautjärvi located near the Russian border, Joronen joined Fulham Academy in 2009. In June 2010, Joronen signed his first professional contract with the club, which would keep him there until 2013.

In May 2012, Joronen signed a two-year extension with Fulham that would keep him with the club until 2014. Five months later, on 25 October 2012, Joronen joined Maidenhead United on loan and in February 2013, Joronen was loaned to Cambridge United. Only a day later, Joronen returned to Fulham after he refused to be named as a substitute for Cambridge.

After a loan spell at Maidenhead United, Joronen then moved back to Finland, where he joined Veikkausliiga side FC Lahti on loan until August. After making eighteen appearances for the club, where he established himself as a first-choice goalkeeper, Joronen returned to his parent club in early August.

At the start of the 2014–15 season, Joronen signed a two-year contract with the club that kept him until 2016. He was then given his debut as the starting goalkeeper in Fulham's opening game in the Championship against Ipswich Town on 9 August 2014. After making three more appearances for the club, Joronen soon lost his first-team place to Marcus Bettinelli and new goalkeeper signing Gábor Király.

Joronen joined Accrington Stanley on loan for one month on 17 October 2014. He made his Accrington Stanley debut the next day, starting in goal, in a 2–1 loss against Stevenage. However, after making three more appearances at Accrington Stanley whilst on loan, he returned early after dislocating his kneecap during a League Two match against Morecambe. Then, it was announced that Joronen would be out for three to four months.

On 27 August 2015, Joronen signed for Stevenage on loan until January 2016. He made his Stevenage debut two days later, in a 1–1 draw against Dagenham & Redbridge. Joronen scored with a long-range clearance in a match against Wycombe Wanderers on 17 October 2015. He then kept his first clean sheet in a 3–0 win over Gillingham in the first round of the FA Cup. However, after making eleven appearances for the side, Joronen suffered an injury during the match against Gillingham and subsequently returned to his parent club. After returning to his parent club, Joronen signed a contract extension, keeping him there until 2017.

In the 2016–17 season, Joronen was featured three times in the EFL Cup, being the first-choice goalkeeper ahead of Bettinelli. At the end of the 2016–17 season, he was offered a new contract by the club.

AC Horsens
However, instead of signing a new contract, Joronen left Fulham to join Danish side AC Horsens, signing a two-year contract on 10 July 2017.

Joronen made his AC Horsens debut in the opening game of the season, in a 2–1 win over AGF Aarhus. On 4 August 2017, he kept his first clean sheet for the side, in a 1–0 win over Silkeborg, a win that saw the club go to the top of the table.

FC Copenhagen
On 15 December 2017, it was announced that Joronen would join Copenhagen in the summer of 2018 for a fee of €875,000. He signed a five-year contract. He made his competitive debut on 23 July 2018, playing the entirety of a 3–0 league victory over Hobro.

Brescia Calcio 
On 11 July 2019, Joronen joined Brescia on a permanent deal, after one season with Copenhagen.

Venezia FC
On 30 June 2022, Joronen signed a three-year contract with an option for the fourth year with Venezia.

International career
Having represented Finland at U17, U19 and U21 level, Joronen was called up to the senior squad and made his debut for Finland in the 2013 King's Cup against Thailand on 24 January 2013.

Joronen was called up for the UEFA Euro 2020 pre-tournament friendly match against Sweden on 29 May 2021.

Career statistics

Honours
Copenhagen
Danish Superliga: 2018–19

References

External links

Jesse Joronen profile  at AC Horsens

1993 births
Living people
Finnish footballers
Finland international footballers
Finland under-21 international footballers
Finland youth international footballers
Association football goalkeepers
Fulham F.C. players
Maidenhead United F.C. players
Cambridge United F.C. players
FC Lahti players
Accrington Stanley F.C. players
Stevenage F.C. players
AC Horsens players
F.C. Copenhagen players
Brescia Calcio players
Venezia F.C. players
English Football League players
National League (English football) players
Danish Superliga players
Serie A players
Serie B players
UEFA Euro 2020 players
Finnish expatriate footballers
Finnish expatriate sportspeople in England
Expatriate footballers in England
Finnish expatriate sportspeople in Denmark
Expatriate men's footballers in Denmark
Finnish expatriate sportspeople in Italy
Expatriate footballers in Italy